Rhododendron maoerense (猫儿山杜鹃) is a rhododendron species native to northeastern Guangxi, China, where it grows at altitudes of 1800–1900 meters. It is a tree that typically grows to 8–12 meters in height, with leaves that are oblanceolate, rarely obovate, and 14–16 × 4–5 cm in size. Flowers are white.

References 
 W. P. Fang & G. Z. Li, Bull. Bot. Res., Harbin. 4(1): 1. 1984.
 The Plant List
 Flora of China
 Hirsutum

maoerense